Ambient 3: Music Of Changes is a 1994 compilation 
album released on the Virgin Records label, part of its 
Ambient series. The compilation was issued as a double CD.

Track listing

CD 1
 Shu-De: "Sygyt, Khoomei, Kargyraa"
 Irmin Schmidt & Bruno Spoerri: "When The Waters Came To Life"
 David Sylvian & Robert Fripp: "Darshana (Remixed By The Future Sound Of London)"
 William Orbit: "Gringatcho Demento"
 Rain Tree Crow: "Red Earth (As Summertime Ends)"
 Ryuichi Sakamoto: "The Last Emperor Theme Variation 1"
 Robert Fripp: "1988"
 David Sylvian: "Epiphany"
 Amorphous Androgynous: "A Study Of Six Guitars"
 Trisan: "May Yo l"
 Bill Laswell: "Kingdom Come"
 Seigen Ono: "You Will Be All Right"
 Laraaji: "Meditation No. 2"
 Bark Psychosis: "Pendulum Man"

CD 2
 Michael Brook: "Distant Village"
 Holger Czukay, Jah Wobble & Jaki Liebezeit: "Mystery R.P.S. (No. 8)"
 Prince Far I: "Throw Away Your Gun (Dub)"
 Harold Budd, Brian Eno: "Wind In Lonely Fences"
 King Crimson: "Nuages (That Which Passes, Passes Like Clouds)"
 Nusrat Fateh Ali Khan: "Mustt Mustt"
 Stephan Micus: "Concert For Gender, Shakuhachi And Zither (Edit)"
 Robert Fripp, Brian Eno: "Healthy Colours lll"
 The Future Sound of London: "Cascade-Parts 2 & 3"
 Robert Quine, Fred Maher: "Summer Storm"
 Jon Hassell, Brian Eno: "Rising Thermal"
 David Sylvian, Holger Czukay: "Mutability (A New Beginning Is In The Offing) Edit"
 Brian Eno: "2/2"

References

1994 compilation albums
Ambient compilation albums
Virgin Records compilation albums